Chromosome 10 open reading frame 99 is a protein that in humans is encoded by the C10orf99 gene.

References 

Genes on human chromosome 10